Sidi Ifni is a province in the Moroccan region of Guelmim-Oued Noun. It was created in 2009 from the southern part of Tiznit Province, and recorded a population of 115,691 in the 2014 Moroccan census. Until 1969, most of its territory was the Provincia de Ifni, with its capital in Sidi Ifni, dependent on Spain.

Administrative divisions
The province is divided into the following municipalities and communes:

References

External links
 Monograph of Sidi Ifni Province (in French)

 
Sidi Ifni Province